Bill Thompson is an American politician who is a former member of the Ohio House of Representatives, serving from 1987 to 1997.

References

External links

Members of the Ohio House of Representatives
Living people
Year of birth missing (living people)